The Cordeliers cloister is situated in France, at the heart of the medieval town of Saint-Emilion in the Gironde area. It is one of the town’s most emblematic and picturesque sites, containing a monolithic church. A listed Historical Monument and a UNESCO World Heritage Site, it also has underground cellars where sparkling wines are produced.

History of the Cordeliers cloister

The Cordeliers before their arrival at the cloister

The cloister gets its name from its first ever occupants, the Cordeliers, Franciscan friars who followed the precepts established by St. Francis of Assisi in 1210. The name was given to them by Jean de Beauffort during the Seventh Crusade on account of their traditional dress of a large brown or grey course cloak fastened with a cord belt.
Before occupying the current cloister the Cordeliers monks most probably lived in a place called ‘Les Menuts’ outside the town walls. Until the development of mechanical cultivation, remnants of the old Cordeliers church could still be seen in the area now occupied by Clos des Menuts. The word ‘menut’ in Gascon means ‘small’ or ‘detail’, and was also the nickname given to the Cordeliers during this period.

The 14th century: the construction of the cloister

In the 14th century numerous battles between the Kings of France and the Dukes of Aquitaine brought unrest to the region. The monastery was pillaged in 1337 during clashes between the Lords of Guyenne and the Counts of Eu and Guinness. To protect themselves against future attacks, the Cordeliers asked to move within the Saint-Emilion walls. They were granted permission in 1338 and immediately began construction work on their chapel. In 1343 they obtained permission from the Pope to establish their monastery within the town, prompting construction of the cloister and part of the monastery building. A few years later the Cordeliers undertook work to convert the chapel into a church, which is still visible today. The rest of the buildings were enclosed inside the walls. In 1383 the King of England finally gave the monks a plot of building land right next to their old home but this time on the right side of the wall.

The French Revolution: the cloister is abandoned

The Cordeliers occupied these sites for the four centuries leading up to the French Revolution in 1789. During this period the monastery consisted of a church, an entrance courtyard, a winery, a vat room, a cellar, a garden and a dormitory building with six bedrooms. The revolution threw the life of the cloister into turmoil and the order was banned. All 284 monasteries occupied by the Cordeliers monks in France were closed down. The building became national property and its occupants were dispersed. The Cordeliers order was finally authorised again in 1850, but no-one came to claim the Saint-Emilion monastery.
The cloister was then left abandoned and nature took its course. Ivy invaded the alleyways and climbed over the buildings. The spot became a favourite haunt for lovers, eccentrics, romantics and even goths. In the 19th century the writer Maurice Graterrole described the unusual ambience of the location:

‘A heavy, almost frightening silence weights on its pious ruins, now home only to night owls. These crumbling walls, these broken and mossy stones, this fickle and wild vegetation forming a dome above the cloister which is almost impenetrable to sunlight all gradually grip your heart despite itself and you are seized with such melancholy sadness, as if you were suddenly transported into the solitude so mournfully sung by the prophet of the Lamentations. And yet, an infinite poetry lies behind it all!’

Late 19th century: a new lease of life for the cloister
In the late 19th century the new owners had idea of using the basements and underground cellars to make and age sparkling wines under the name ‘MM.G.MEYNOT et Compagnie’. Since then various owners have come and gone, each adding their own ideas and expertise and drawing on many years of Cordeliers history. This tradition is still continued today in the manufacture of a legendary sparkling wine.

The cloister in popular culture

The cloister’s existence has been punctuated with periods of slaughter and of peace, making it a place charged with history. This resulted in appearances in the art and culture of various different periods, giving the Cordeliers cloister a firm place in the imagination. For example, in 1839 the cloister’s decoration was reproduced at the Opéra de Paris for a production of ‘Robert le Diable’ by Giacomo Meyerbeer. Pierre Gaspard-Huit also came to the cloister to film scenes for his film ‘La mariée était trop belle’ with Brigitte Bardot and Micheline Presle.

Architecture

The cloister was made from limestone which is prevalent in the Saint-Emilion area. Its architecture is Romanesque in style, rubbing shoulders with the old Gothic-style chapel and church. Its columns are monolithic, in other words cut from a single stone from the base to the capital. Small crests are hidden in the abacuses. The Romanesque rounded arches were built in the 14th century and stand near additional Gothic pointed arches in the background. Other visible elements include a small tower which is the remains of the church tower, a very simple sweeping arc spanning the church from one wall to the other, columns without capitals, and windows.

LES CORDELIERS sparkling wines

The Traditional method
The Cordeliers cloister has a network of cellars and tunnels stretching for three kilometres beneath the village of Saint-Emilion. The constant temperature of 12 °C and total darkness they provide ensure perfect conditions for fermenting wines. LES CORDELIERS sparkling wines are produced and stored in these cellars using the traditional ‘champenoise’ method. The grapes are picked by hand using small, open trays and then lightly pressed (yielding 100l of wine per 150 kg of grapes) using pneumatic presses. This is followed by alcoholic fermentation and wine blending, using unique processes for each particular cuvée produced by LES CORDELIERS. The wines are transferred directly into bottles and yeast and sugar are added, prompting a natural fermentation process within the bottle which releases carbon dioxide into the wine to produce the sparkle. Following a period of aging the lees lasting for at least 12 months, the bottles undergo daily riddling to help settle out the yeast deposit ready for disgorging. After this the bottles are topped up with ‘liqueur d’expédition’ (a mixture of the base wine and sugar) in a process known as dosage, before the final corking and fitting of wire caps.

Wine characteristics

Les Cordeliers produce around ten different white and rosé sparkling wines, both brut and demi-sec. They are made from the most famous grape varieties of the Bordeaux region including Merlot, Sémillon, Cabernet Franc and Sauvignon. The white sparkling wines boast a brilliant pale yellow colour with greenish tints when young and dashes of gold when they age. They produce very fine bubbles which form a string. The bouquet is reminiscent of white and yellow flowers (hawthorn, lime-tree, acacia), summer fruits (peach, apricot) and citrus (lemon, grapefruit).
The rosés have a salmon-pink colour, reminiscent of onion peel. Highly aromatic on the palate, they are characterised by red fruit flavours (cherry, raspberry, strawberry) and great complexity. Sparkling wines should be served at between 5 °C and 7 °C and are ideal as an aperitif or with fish, desserts and cheeses.

See also
 Cremant
 Saint-Emilion

References

External links

 
 Saint-Emilion Tourism Office

Buildings and structures in Gironde